Osmanthus   is a genus of about 30 species of flowering plants in the family Oleaceae. Most of the species are native to eastern Asia (China, Japan, Korea, Indochina, the Himalayas, etc.),and was originally found in the middle east of the Himalayas,  with a few species from the Caucasus, New Caledonia, and Sumatra. Osmanthus has been known in China since ancient times with the earliest writings coming from the Warring States period; the book Sea and Mountain. South Mountain states: "Zhaoyao Mountain had a lot of Osmanthus".

The leaves are opposite, evergreen, and simple, with an entire, serrated or coarsely toothed margin. The flowers are produced in spring, summer or autumn, each flower being about 1 cm long, white, with a four-lobed tubular-based corolla ('petals'). The flowers grow in small panicles, and in several species have a strong fragrance. The fruit is a small (10–15 mm), hard-skinned dark blue to purple drupe containing a single seed.

Species
Species accepted:
 Osmanthus armatus Diels – Shaanxi, Sichuan, Hubei, Hunan
 Osmanthus attenuatus P.S.Green – Guangxi, Guizhou, Yunnan
 Osmanthus austrocaledonicus (Vieill.) Knobl. – New Caledonia
 Osmanthus cooperi Hemsl. – Anhui, Fujian, Jiangsu, Jiangxi, Zhejiang
 Osmanthus cymosus (Guillaumin) P.S.Green – New Caledonia
 Osmanthus decorus (Boiss. & Balansa) Kasapligil – Caucasian osmanthus – Turkey, Caucasus
 Osmanthus delavayi Franch. – Guizhou, Sichuan, Yunnan
 Osmanthus didymopetalus P.S.Green – Guangdong, Hainan
 Osmanthus enervius Masam. & T.Mori – Taiwan, Nansei Islands
 Osmanthus fordii Hemsl. – Guangdong, Guangxi
 Osmanthus fragrans Lour. – Sweet osmanthus, sweet olive, fragrant tea olive – Himalayas (northern and eastern India, Nepal, Bhutan, Assam), Indochina (Myanmar, Thailand, Cambodia, Vietnam), Japan, China (Guizhou, Sichuan, Yunnan, Sichuan), Taiwan
 Osmanthus gracilinervis L.C.Chia ex R.L.Lu – Guangdong, Guangxi, Hunan, Jiangxi, Zhejiang
 Osmanthus hainanensis P.S.Green – Hainan
 Osmanthus henryi P.S.Green – Guizhou, Hunan, Yunnan
 Osmanthus heterophyllus (G.Don) P.S.Green – Holly osmanthus, holly olive, false holly, mock holly, hiiragi – Japan, Taiwan, Nansei Islands
 Osmanthus insularis Koidz. – Korea, Japan, Nansei Islands, Ogasawara Islands, 
 Osmanthus iriomotensis T.Yamaz – Nansei Islands
 Osmanthus kaoi (T.S.Liu & J.C.Liao) S.Y.Lu – Taiwan
 Osmanthus lanceolatus Hayata – Taiwan
 Osmanthus monticola (Schltr.) Knobl. – New Caledonia
 Osmanthus pubipedicellatus L.C.Chia ex H.T.Chang – Guangdong
 Osmanthus reticulatus P.S.Green – Guangdong, Guangxi, Guizhou, Hunan, Sichuan
 Osmanthus rigidus Nakai – Kyushu
 Osmanthus serrulatus Rehder in C.S.Sargent – Sichuan
 Osmanthus suavis King ex C.B.Clarke in J.D.Hooker – Assam, Bhutan, Nepal, Sikkim, Myanmar, Yunnan, Tibet
 Osmanthus urceolatus P.S.Green - Sichuan, Hubei
 Osmanthus venosus Pamp. – Hubei
 Osmanthus yunnanensis (Franch.) P.S.Green – Yunnan, Tibet

Species transferred to Cartrema:
 Osmanthus americanus (L.) A.Gray – Devilwood – southeastern US from Texas to Virginia; eastern and southern Mexico
 Osmanthus floridanus Chapman - Florida
 Osmanthus marginatus (Champ. ex Benth.) Hemsl. – Nansei Islands, Taiwan, Vietnam, Anhui, Fujian, Guangdong, Guangxi, Guizhou, Hainan, Hunan, Jiangxi, Sichuan, Yunnan, Zhejiang
 Osmanthus matsumuranus Hayata – Assam, Thailand, Laos, Cambodia, Vietnam, Anhui, Guangdong, Guangxi, Guizhou, Jiangxi, Taiwan, Yunnan, Zhejiang 
 Osmanthus minor P.S.Green – Fujian, Guangdong, Guangxi, Jiangxi, Zhejiang
 Osmanthus scortechinii King & Gamble – Thailand, Sumatra, Peninsular Malaysia
 Osmanthus sumatranus P.S.Green – Sumatra

Garden hybrids
Osmanthus × burkwoodii (Burkwood & Skipwith) P.S.Green  (O. delavayi × O. decorus)
Osmanthus × fortunei Carrière (O. fragrans × O. heterophyllus)

Cultivation

Osmanthus are popular shrubs in parks and gardens throughout the warm temperate zone. Several hybrids and cultivars have been developed. Osmanthus flower on old wood and produce more flowers if unpruned. A pruned shrub often produces few or no flowers for one to five or more years, before the new growth matures sufficiently to start flowering.

In Japan, Osmanthus fragrans Lour. var. aurantiacus Makino (fragrant orange-colored olive) (kin-mokusei) is a favorite garden shrub. Its small deep golden flowers appear in short-stalked clusters in late autumn. It has an intense sweet fragrance. A variant with white flowers (gin-mokusei) is also popular.

Uses

The flowers of O. fragrans are used throughout East Asia for their scent and flavour, which is likened to apricot and peach.

In China, osmanthus tea (guìhuāchá) combines sweet osmanthus flowers with black or green tea leaves. In Liuzhou, it is used to flavor a locally brewed beer. 
Sweet osmanthus and osmanthus tea are particularly associated with the city of Guilin (桂林, literally "Forest of Sweet Osmanthus").

Osmanthus wine is prepared by infusing whole Osmanthus fragrans flowers in huangjiu or other types of rice wine and is traditionally consumed during the Mid-Autumn Festival.

PepsiCo makes osmanthus flavored Pepsi for the Chinese domestic market.

References

External links 

 

 
Oleaceae genera